Deviation may refer to:

Mathematics and engineering
 Allowance (engineering), an engineering and machining allowance is a planned deviation between an actual dimension and a nominal or theoretical dimension, or between an intermediate-stage dimension and an intended final dimension.
 Deviation (statistics), the difference between the value of an observation and the mean of the population in mathematics and statistics
 Standard deviation, which is based on the square of the difference
 Absolute deviation, where the absolute value of the difference is used
 Relative standard deviation, in probability theory and statistics is the absolute value of the coefficient of variation
 Deviation of a local ring in mathematics
 Deviation of a poset in mathematics
 Frequency deviation, the maximum allowed "distance" in FM radio from the nominal frequency a station broadcasts at
 Magnetic deviation, the error induced in compasses by local magnetic fields

Albums 
 Deviation (Jayne County album), 1995
 Deviation (Béla Fleck album), 1984
 Deviate (album), a 1998 album by Kill II This

Other uses
 Bid‘ah, Islamic term for innovations and deviations acts or groups from orthodox Islamic law (Sharia).
 Deviance (sociology), a behavior that is a recognized violation of social norms
 Deviation (1971 film), a horror film
 Deviation (2006 film), a short film
 Deviation, a 2012 British thriller film starring Danny Dyer
 Deviation (law) is a departure from a contract or a ship's course, thus breaching the contract
 Deviationism, an expressed belief which is not in accordance with official party doctrine
 A work of art in the online community DeviantArt

See also
 Deviance (disambiguation)
 Deviant (disambiguation)
 Devious (disambiguation)